The Copa Masters CONMEBOL (or Supercopa Conmebol) was a football club competition contested by the 4 past winners of the Copa CONMEBOL at the time. The cup is one of the many inter-South American club competitions that have been organized by CONMEBOL.

It was played from February 8 to February 12, 1996, and it was contested in the city of Cuiabá with the participations of Atlético Mineiro, Botafogo, São Paulo, and Rosario Central. São Paulo won the competition after defeating Atlético Mineiro in the final 3-0.

Eligible teams 
Only four editions of the Copa CONMEBOL had been played by early 1996 and all four champions participated.

Tournament overview

Semifinals

Final

Scorers
5 goals
 Almir
3 goals
 Túlio
 Valdir Bigode
1 goal
 Edmílson
 Ailton

References

Defunct CONMEBOL club competitions
1996 in South American football
Copa CONMEBOL
CON